PS-103 Karachi East-V is a constituency of the Provincial Assembly of Sindh.

General elections 2018

General elections 2013

See also
 PS-102 Karachi East-IV
 PS-104 Karachi East-VI

References

External links
 Election commission Pakistan's official website
 Awazoday.com check result
 Official Website of Government of Sindh

Constituencies of Sindh